The House of Delegates of Palau is the lower house of the Palau National Congress (Olbiil era Kelulau), Palau's bicameral legislature. The Senate of Palau is the upper house. The House of Delegates has 16 members, each serving four-year terms in single-seat constituencies. Each state represents one constituency. No political parties exist. The last election was held on 3 November 2020.

Palau Legislature 1955-1980 
The High Commissioner of the Trust Territory of the Pacific Islands established Palau legislature, Olbiil era Kelulau, in January 1955 by a charter. The legislature was composed of 28 members elected every four years. The presiding officer was initially called Bedul Olbiil. The members of the legislature were organized into Liberal and Progressive parties.

Speaker of the House of Delegates

References 

Palau
Government of Palau
Palau National Congress
1980 establishments in Palau